Avela is a genus of moths in the subfamily Arctiinae. It contains the single species Avela diversa, which is found in Brazil.

References

Natural History Museum Lepidoptera generic names catalog

Lithosiini
Monotypic moth genera
Moths of South America